Roch-Ambroise Cucurron Sicard (20 September 1742 – 10 May 1822) was a French abbé and instructor of the deaf.

Born at Le Fousseret, in the ancient Province of Languedoc (now the Department of Haute-Garonne), and educated as a priest, Sicard was made principal of a school for the deaf at Bordeaux in 1786, and in 1789, on the death of the Abbé de l'Épée, succeeded him at a leading school for the deaf which Épée had founded in Paris. He later met Thomas Hopkins Gallaudet while traveling in England, and invited him to visit the school.

Sicard's chief works were his Eléments de grammaire générale (1799), Cours d'instruction d'un sourd-muet de naissance (1800) and Traité des signes pour l'instruction des sourds-muets (1808). The Abbé Sicard managed to escape any serious harm in the political troubles of 1792, and became a member of the Institute in 1795, but the value of his educational work was hardly recognized till shortly before his death at Paris.

In 1803 Sicard became a member of the Académie française, occupying Seat 3 as the successor to the François-Joachim de Pierre de Bernis, who was a diplomat.

See also
 Roch-Ambroise Auguste Bébian

References

1742 births
1822 deaths
People from Haute-Garonne
19th-century French Roman Catholic priests
18th-century French Roman Catholic priests
Educators of the deaf
Members of the Académie Française
Recipients of the Legion of Honour
Burials at Père Lachaise Cemetery
18th-century French educators
19th-century French educators
French Sign Language